Gairapatan is the name of Ward Number 4 in Pokhara Metropolitan City in Nepal. Parts of Chipledhunga is located in this ward.

References

Wards of Pokhara